Several comic book and comic strip writers, artists, and others have appeared within the fictional world of comics, both their own and others'. Some appear as simple characters in the story, some appear as characters who break the fourth wall and address the reader directly, and some make cameo appearances in framing sequences to introduce a story and sometimes to have a last word.

" * " = "behind the scenes" stories not in regular continuity

A
 Jack Abel
 Sgt Fury and His Howing Commandos #164 (June 1981)
 Jack Adler
 Superman's Girl Friend Lois Lane #117 (December 1971):"Rose and the Thorn: The Ghost with Two Faces" (as "Zack Adler")

 Arthur Adams
 Excalibur: Mojo Mayhem (December 1989)

 Mike Allred
 FF vol 2 #10 (September 2013): "Paint it Black"
Ross Andru
Wonder Woman #158 (November 1965): "The End -- Or the Beginning!"
 Jim Aparo
 The Brave and the Bold #124 (January 1976): "Small War of the Super Rifles"

Sergio Aragones
Jon Sable, Freelance #33 (July 1986)

Dick Ayers
Sgt. Fury and his Howling Commandos #22 (September 1965): "Don't Turn Your Back on Bull McGiveney!"
Sgt. Fury and his Howling Commandos Special #4 (Aug. 1968): "Gary and Dick Up Front!"
Sgt. Fury and his Howling Commandos Special #6 (Aug. 1970): "Through the Past Darkly"
Sgt. Fury and his Howling Commandos #100 (July 1972): "100th Anniversary!"

B
 David Baldeón
Gwenpool Strikes Again #3 (Oct. 2019)

 Cary Bates
 The Flash #228 (Aug. 1974): "The Day I Saved The Flash!"
 Justice League of America #123 (Oct. 1975): "Where on Earth Am I?"
 Justice League of America #124 (Nov. 1975): "Avenging Ghosts of the Justice Society!"

 Karen Berger
 Captain America #267 (March 1992): "The Man Who Made a Difference!"
 The New Teen Titans #20 (June 1982): "A Titanic Tale of Titans' Tomfoolery!"
 normalman-Megaton Man Special #1 (August 1994): "Lest No Bridge Be Unburned"

 Alfred Bester
 Comic Cavalcade #6 (Spring 1944): "They Are Invincible!"

 Otto Binder
 Shazam #1 (Feb. 1973): "In The Beginning"

 Bob Bolling
 Pep Comics #400 (May 1985): "Pep 400"

 Murray Boltinoff
 The Brave and the Bold #124 (January 1976): "Small War of the Super Rifles"
 The Doom Patrol #121 (Sept./Oct. 1968): "The Death of the Doom Patrol?"

 Brian Bondurant
 Duck-Girl #0 (Aug. 2000): "Made in Japan."

 B. C. Boyer
 The Masked Man #9 (April 1986): "The End"

 Tom Breevoort
 FF vol 2 #10 (September 2013): "Paint it Black"

 Dick Briefer
 Prize Comics #30 (April 1943): "Frankenstein"

 John Broome
 Detective Comics 343 (September 1965): "The Secret War of the Phantom General"

 Sol Brodsky
 Sub-Mariner #19 (November 1969): "Support Your Local Sting-Ray!"
 What If? #11 (Oct. 1978): "What if the Fantastic Four Were the Original Marvel Bullpen?"
 Eliot R. Brown
 Uncanny X-Men Annual #7 (1983): "Scavenger Hunt"
 Frank Brunner
 Iron Man #72 (January 1975): "Convention of Fear!"
 Harry Brunt
 Dime Comics #27 (May 1946): "Lank The Yank"
 Rich Buckler
 Astonishing Tales #25 (Aug. 1970): "Deathlok The Demolisher"

 Brian Buniak
Thunder Bunny #1 (Jan. 1984), "The Greatest Story Ever Told"

Carl Burgos
Marvel Mystery Comics #34 (Aug. 1942): "The Human Torch"
Strange Tales #123 (Aug. 1964): "The Birth of the Beetle"

 Kurt Busiek
 The Avengers vol. 3, #14 (March 1999): "Hi, Honey... ...I'm Hooooome!" *

 John Byrne
 E-Man #6 (Charlton, January 1875): "Rog 2000 in That Was No Lady" (as "Burns")
 Iron Fist #8 (October 1976): "Like Tigers in the Night!"
 Iron Fist #15 (Sept. 1977): "Enter the X-Men"
 X-Men  #121 (May 1979): "Shoot-Out At The Stampede!"
  Fantastic Four #216 (March 1980): "Where There Be Gods!"
 E-Man #2 (First Comics, 1982)
 Destroyer Duck #2-6 (1982) - parody character "Booster Cogburn"
 The Complete Rog 2000 (1982): "The Coming of the Gang"
 Fantastic Four #262 (January 1984): "The Trial of Mr. Fantastic"
 The Star Brand #11 (Jan. 1988): "Celebrity"
 The Star Brand #12 (Mar. 1988): "The White Event Explained!" – "killed" in an explosion at a Pittsburgh-area comic book convention
 The Sensational She-Hulk  #41 (July 1992): "Rock & Ruin"
 The Sensational She-Hulk #50: (April 1993): "He's Dead?!"
 Hulk #1 (April 1999): "Everything You Ever Wanted To Know About The Hulk (But Were Afraid To Ask!)"

C
 Milton Caniff
 Pin-Up (1995 – )
 Mike Carlin
 Captain America #289 (Jan. 1984): Cover and "Bernie America, Sentinel of Liberty"
 Al Capp
 Li'l Abner (April 1951): 16. and 17. April daily strips
 Action Comics #55 (Dec. 1942): "A Goof Named Tiny Rufe"* (as "Al Hatt"}
 Paul Chadwick
 Concrete Eclectica #2 (1993)
 Hank Chapman
 Astonishing #4 (June 1951): "The Nightmare"
 Chris Claremont
 X-Men #98 (April 1976): "Merry Christmas, X-Men..."
 X-Men  #105 (June 1977): "The Flame, The Frenzy... and Firelord", pp. 10 and 11
 Iron Fist #15 (Sept. 1977): "Enter the X-Men"
Man-Thing vol. 2, #11 (July 1981): "Hell's Gate"
 Marvel Premiere #24 (Sept. 1975): "Summerkill"
 Excalibur: Mojo Mayhem (December 1989)
 normalman-Megaton Man Special #1 (August 1994): "Lest No Bridge Be Unburned"
 Ta-Nehisi Coates 
 Howard The Duck #10 (October 2016): "...Hell If I Know..." (as "Ta-Nehi-C")
Dave Cockrum
 X-Men  #105 (June 1977): "The Flame, The Frenzy... and Firelord", pp. 10 and 11
 Iron Fist #15 (Sept. 1977): "Enter the X-Men"
 E-Man #2 (First Comics, 1982)

Paty Cockrum
 Iron Fist #15 (Sept. 1977): "Enter the X-Men"
 Gene Colan
 Daredevil Special #1 (Sept. 1967): "At the Stroke of Midnight" *
 Jack Cole
Crack Comics #33, 34 (August 1943): "Inkie"
 Amanda Conner
 Harley Quinn #0 (2013): "Picky Sicky"
 Harley Quinn #27 (2017): "Master of Her Domain"
 Gerry Conway
 Batman #237 (Dec. 1971): "Night of the Reaper"
 Justice League of America #103 (Dec. 1972): "A Stranger Walks among Us!"
 Amazing Adventures #16 (Jan. 1973): "And the Juggernaut Will Get You... If You Don't Watch Out!"
 Thor #207 (Jan. 1973): "Firesword!"
 Fantastic Four #176 (Nov. 1976): "Improbable As It May Seem – The Impossible Man Is Back in Town!"

D
Nicholas Da Silva aka ZOOLOOK
 X-Men Forever 2  #11 (November 10, 2010): "The Gathering Storm", pp. 1, 2, 3 and 5

 Peter David
 The Incredible Hulk #418 (June 1994) "We are Gathered Here"

 Alan Davis
 Excalibur #24 (July 1990) "Tempting Fates"

 Dan DeCarlo
 Pep Comics #400 (May 1985): "Pep 400"
 Millie the Model #77 (April 1957): untitled story
 Dan DeCarlo Jr
 Pep Comics #400 (May 1985): "Pep 400"
 James DeCarlo
 Pep Comics #400 (May 1985): "Pep 400"
 Tom DeFalco
 The Sensational She-Hulk #50: (April 1993): "He's Dead?!"
 J.M. DeMatteis
 Captain America #289 (Jan. 1984): Cover
Dan Didio
 Harley Quinn Invades Comic-Con International San Diego #1 (Sept 2014)
Paul Dini
 Harley Quinn Invades Comic-Con International San Diego #1 (Sept 2014)
 Steve Ditko
 The Amazing Spider-Man Annual #1 (1964): "How Stan Lee and Steve Ditko Create Spider-Man"
 Dr Strange #55 (1982): "To Have Loved... And Lost" (under the anagram name of "Ted Tevoski")

 Lela Dowling
 Dragon's Teeth #1 (1983): "Inspiration"

 Frank Doyle
 Pep Comics #400 (May 1985): "Pep 400"

E
Scott Edelman
 Iron Man #85 (April 1976): "...And The Freak Shall Inherit the Earth"
Joe Edwards
 Archie #2 (Spring 1943): "Bumble the Bee-tective"
 Will Eisner
 The Spirit (June 8, 1947)
 The Spirit (December 31, 1950), "Happy New Year"
 The Spirit (January 13, 1952), "Last Day of the Planet Earth"
 The Spirit (July 20, 1952), "Marry the Spirit"
 The Spirit #17 (1977) and #30 (1981)
Cerebus Jam #1 (April 1985), "Cerebus v The Spirit"
 The Dreamer (1986)
Harlan Ellison
Dark Horse Presents #66 (Sept. 1992): "Concrete: Byrdland's Secret"
Justice League of America #89 (March 1971): "The Most Dangerous Dreams of All"
 normalman-Megaton Man Special #1 (August 1994): "Lest No Bridge Be Unburned"
Whitney Ellsworth
Lois Lane, Girl Reporter comic strip #8 (1944): untitled
 Steve Englehart
 Justice League of America #103 (Dec. 1972): "A Stranger Walks among Us!"
Master of Kung Fu #17 (April 1974): "Lair of the Lost"
 Amazing Adventures #16 (Jan. 1973): "And the Juggernaut Will Get You... If You Don't Watch Out!"
 Thor #207 (Jan. 1973): "Firesword!"
 Fantastic Four #333 (Mid-Nov. 1989): "The Dream is Dead Part Two" (under his pen name John Harkness)
 Trevor Von Eeden
 Black Lightining #1 (April 1977)
Mike Esposito
Wonder Woman #158 (November 1965): "The End -- Or the Beginning!"
 Sub-Mariner #19 (November 1969): "Support Your Local Sting-Ray!"
 Bill Everett
Marvel Mystery Comics #34 (Aug. 1942): "The Human Torch"
 Sub-Mariner #19 (November 1969): "Support Your Local Sting-Ray!"

F
 Lee Falk
The Phantom: Mystery of Cape Cod (1986), The Triads (1994)
 Jules Feiffer
 The Spirit (January 13, 1952), "Last Day of the Planet Earth"
 The Spirit (December 31, 1950), "Happy New Year"
 Al Feldstein
Weird Fantasy #14 (1952)
 Danny Fingeroth
Man-Thing vol. 2, #11 (July 1981): "Hell's Gate"
 Linda Florio
Marvel Preview  #23 (black and white magazine format, Fall, 1980): "Annie Mae"
 Gardner Fox
 All-Flash #14 (Spring 1944)
 Strange Adventures #140 (May 1962), "The Strange Adventure That Really Happened"
 Detective Comics #347 (January 1966), "The Strange Death of Batman!"
 Matt Fraction
 FF vol 2 #10 (September 2013): "Paint it Black"
Gary Friedrich
Sgt. Fury and his Howling Commandos Special #4 (Aug. 1968): "Gary and Dick Up Front!"
 Sub-Mariner #19 (November 1969): "Support Your Local Sting-Ray!"
Sgt. Fury and his Howling Commandos Special #6 (Aug. 1970): "Through the Past Darkly"
Sgt. Fury and his Howling Commandos #100 (July 1972): "100th Anniversary!"
Mike Friedrich
Justice League of America #89 (March 1971): "The Most Dangerous Dreams of All"
Iron Man #72 (January 1975): "Convention of Fear!"

G
Neil Gaiman
Marvel 1602 #5 (Feb 2004) *
Wolff & Byrd, Counsellors of the Macabre #4 (Nov. 1994):"A Host of Horrors"
 normalman-Megaton Man Special #1 (August 1994): "Lest No Bridge Be Unburned"
 William Gaines
Weird Fantasy #14 (1952)
Ron Garney
 Hulk #1 (April 1999): "Everything You Ever Wanted To Know About The Hulk (But Were Afraid To Ask!)"
Steve Gerber
Man-Thing (1974 series) #22: "Pop Goes the Cosmos!"
Howard the Duck #16: "Zen and the Art of Comic Book Writing"
Frank Giacoia
 Sub-Mariner #19 (November 1969): "Support Your Local Sting-Ray!"
Michael T Gilbert
Mr. Monster #7 (December 1986): "Mr. Monster's Bedtime Story"
Kieron Gillen
 You Are Deadpool #1 
Dick Giordano
 The New Teen Titans #20 (June 1982): "A Titanic Tale of Titans' Tomfoolery!"
 George Gladir
 Pep Comics #400 (May 1985): "Pep 400"
 Stan Goldberg
 Pep Comics #400 (May 1985): "Pep 400"
Michael Golden
Detective Comics #482 (February–March 1979): "Bat-Mite's New York Adventure"
Howard the Duck #5 (black and white magazine format, May 1980): "The Tomb of Drãkula!"
 John L. Goldwater
 Pep Comics #400 (May 1985): "Pep 400"
 Jon Goldwater
Stan Lee's Mighty 7: issue 1 (May, 2012): "How It All Began"
 Richard Goldwater
 Pep Comics #400 (May 1985): "Pep 400"
 Martin Goodman (publisher)
Marvel Mystery Comics #34 (Aug. 1942): "The Human Torch"
Sgt. Fury and his Howling Commandos #100 (July 1972): "100th Anniversary!"
Archie Goodwin
 Fantastic Four #176 (Nov. 1976): "Improbable As It May Seem – The Impossible Man Is Back in Town!"
 Ms. Marvel vol 1. #15 (Mar. 1978): "The Shark is a Very Deadly Beast!"
 Freedom Fighters # 9 (Aug 1987), "Blitzkrieg at Buffalo"
 Victor Gorelick
 Pep Comics #400 (May 1985): "Pep 400"
 René Goscinny
 Asterix and the Class Act (2003)
 Asterix and the Missing Scroll (2015)
 Sid Greene
 Strange Adventures #140 (May 1962), "The Strange Adventure That Really Happened"

 Martin L. Greim
Thunder Bunny #1 (Jan. 1984), "The Greatest Story Ever Told"

 Mike Grell
The Warlord #35 (July 1980): "Gambit"
 Barry Grossman
 Pep Comics #400 (May 1985): "Pep 400"
Mark Gruenwald
 Marvel Two-In-One #60 (Feb. 1980): "Happiness is a Warm Alien"
Marvel Preview  #23 (black and white magazine format, Fall, 1980): "Annie Mae"
The Sensational She-Hulk #50: (April 1993): "He's Dead?!"
 The Star Brand #11 (Jan. 1988): "Celebrity"
 The Star Brand #12 (Mar. 1988): "The White Event Explained!"  – "killed" in an explosion at a Pittsburgh-area comic book convention

H
 Mark Hanerfeld
 Batman #237 (Dec. 1971): "Night of the Reaper"

 Bo Hampton
Cerebus Jam #1 (April 1985), "The Defense of Fort Columbia"

 Scott Hampton
Cerebus Jam #1 (April 1985), "The Defense of Fort Columbia"

 Bob Haney
 The Brave and the Bold #124 (January 1976): "Small War of the Super Rifles"
 Bob Harras
 Harley Quinn Invades Comic-Con International San Diego #1 (Sept 2014)
 Jack C. Harris
Detective Comics #482 (February–March 1979): "Bat-Mite's New York Adventure"
The Warlord #35 (July 1980): "Gambit"
 Al Hartley
 Pep Comics #400 (May 1985): "Pep 400"
 Christopher Hastings
 Gwenpool Strikes Back #4 (Nov. 2019)
 Don Heck
 Sub-Mariner #19 (November 1969): "Support Your Local Sting-Ray!"
 Fred Hembeck
 The Omega Men #3 (June 1983): "Assault on Euphorix"
 Erica Henderson
 Howard the Duck #10 (October 2016): "...Hell If I Know..." (as "Air-Icka")
 Al Hewetson
 Sub-Mariner #19 (November 1969): "Support Your Local Sting-Ray!"
 Mike Higgins
 Fantastic Four #262 (January 1984): "The Trial of Mr. Fantastic"
 The Star Brand #11 (Jan. 1988): "Celebrity"
 E E Hibbard
 All-Flash #14 (Spring 1944)

I
 Tony Isabella
 Marvel Premiere #21 (Mar. 1975): "Daughters Of The Death-Goddess"

J
 Benito Jacovitti
 Since his 1942 one-shot story Un marinaio nella stratosfera ("A Sailor into the Stratosphere") published by Edizioni A.V.E. until his death in 1997, Jac has very often portrayed himself in his own comics, or at least was referenced by various characters, usually interacting with them.
 Al Jaffee
 Groo the Wanderer vol. 2, #2 (April 1985): "Dragon Killer!"
 Paul Jenkins
 The New Avengers #7–10 (July–Oct. 2005): "The Sentry"
 Arvell Jones
 Marvel Premiere #21 (Mar. 1975): "Daughters Of The Death-Goddess"

K
 Jenette Kahn
Wonder Woman vol. 2, #8, p. 20: "Time Passages"
 Michael Kaluta
 Marvel Premiere #24 (Sept. 1975): "Summerkill"

 Gil Kane
Green Lantern vol. 2 #29 (June 1964): "Half a Green Lantern is Better than None!" *
Green Lantern #45 (June 1966): "Prince Peril's Power Play"
Judgment Day: Aftermath (March 1998)
House of Mystery #180 (1969): "His Name is Kane"
Robert Kanigher
Wonder Woman #158 (November 1965): "The End -- Or the Beginning!"
 Action Comics #476 (March 1977): "Clark Kent's Lonely Christmas!"

 Jack Kirby
 Boy Commandos #1 (Winter 1942–43): "Satan Wears a Swastika"
Headline Comics #37 (Sep/Oct 1949): Cover
 The Fantastic Four #10 (Jan. 1963): "The Return of Doctor Doom"
 Fantastic Four Special #5 (Nov. 1967): "This is a Plot?" *
 Sub-Mariner #19 (November 1969): "Support Your Local Sting-Ray!"

 X-Men #98 (April 1976): "Merry Christmas, X-Men..."
 Iron Man #85 (April 1976): "...And The Freak Shall Inherit the Earth"
 What If? #11 (Oct. 1978): "What if the Fantastic Four Were the Original Marvel Bullpen?"
Thunder Bunny #1 (Jan. 1984), "The Greatest Story Ever Told"
 The Dreamer by Will Eisner (1986)
 Denis Kitchen
 The Spirit #30 (Kitchen Sink Press, 1981)
 Todd Klein
Detective Comics #482 (February–March 1979): "Bat-Mite's New York Adventure"

 Andy Kubert
Marvel 1602 #5 (Feb 2004)

 Katie Kubert
Harley Quinn Invades Comic-Con International San Diego #1 (Sept 2014)
 Morrie Kuramoto
 Sub-Mariner #19 (November 1969): "Support Your Local Sting-Ray!"

L
 Michèle Laframboise
La Plume Japonaise (2006), previously serialized in Mensuhell #57–77 (Aug. 2004–  April 2006)
 Rudy Lapick
 Pep Comics #400 (May 1985): "Pep 400"
 Bob Layton
 The Complete Rog 2000 (1982): "The Coming of the Gang"
Jim Lee
 Harley Quinn Invades Comic-Con International San Diego #1 (Sept 2014)
 Stan Lee
 All Winners Comics #2 (Fall 1941): "Winners All" (two-page text story)
 Mystic Comics #10 (August 1942): "Red Skeleton" (as "Stanley Dee")
 Astonishing #4 (June 1951): "The Nightmare"
 Adventures into Terror #5 (August 1951): "Find Me! Find Me! Find Me!" (as 'Lee Stanton')
Mystery Tales #24 (December 1954): "Cast of Characters!"
 Millie the Model #77 (April 1957): untitled story
 The Fantastic Four #10 (Jan. 1963): "The Return of Doctor Doom"
 The Amazing Spider-Man Annual #1 (1964): "How Stan Lee and Steve Ditko Create Spider-Man" *
Strange Tales #123 (Aug. 1964): "The Birth of the Beetle"
Sgt. Fury and his Howling Commandos #22 (September 1965): "Don't Turn Your Back on Bull McGiveney!"
 Daredevil #29 (June 1967): "Unmasked"
 Daredevil Special #1 (Sept. 1967): "At the Stroke of Midnight" *
 Fantastic Four Special #5 (Nov. 1967): "This is a Plot?" *
 The Amazing Spider-Man Special #5 (Nov. 1968): "Here We Go-a-Plotting" *
 Sub-Mariner #19 (November 1969): "Support Your Local Sting-Ray!"
 Chamber of Darkness #2 (Dec. 1969) "The Day of the Red Death" (host)
Sgt. Fury and his Howling Commandos Special #6 (Aug. 1970): "Through the Past Darkly"
Sgt. Fury and his Howling Commandos #100 (July 1972): "100th Anniversary!"

 X-Men #98 (April 1976): "Merry Christmas, X-Men..."
 Iron Man #85 (April 1976): "...And The Freak Shall Inherit the Earth"
 Fantastic Four #176 (Nov. 1976): "Improbable As It May Seem – The Impossible Man Is Back in Town!"

 What If? #11 (Oct. 1978): "What if the Fantastic Four Were the Original Marvel Bullpen?"

 Peter Parker, The Spectacular Spider-Man #54 (May 1981): "To Save the Smuggler!"
 Dr Strange #55 (1982): "To Have Loved... And Lost" (under the anagram name of "Les Tane")
 Stan Lee Meets Superheroes (five issues from Nov. 2006)
Stan Lee's Mighty 7: issues 1-3 (May, July and September 2012)
Marvel Universe Avengers and Ultimate Spider-Man#1 (October 2012): "...Ultimate Peter Parker"
 Kate Leth
 Patsy Walker A.K.A. Hellcat! issues 7-8 (August and September 2016)
 Paul Levitz
 Legion of Super-Heroes #297 (March 1983)
 normalman-Megaton Man Special #1 (August 1994): "Lest No Bridge Be Unburned"
 Larry Lieber
 The Amazing Spider-Man Special #5 (Nov. 1968): "Here We Go-a-Plotting" *
 Sub-Mariner #19 (November 1969): "Support Your Local Sting-Ray!"
Sgt. Fury and his Howling Commandos Special #6 (Aug. 1970): "Through the Past Darkly"
Marvel Team-Up 74 (Oct. 1978): "Live From New York It's Saturday Night"
 Peter Parker, The Spectacular Spider-Man #54 (May 1981): "To Save the Smuggler!"

M
 Howard Mackie
 The Star Brand #11 (Jan. 1988): "Celebrity"
 Ralph Macchio
 Marvel Two-In-One #60 (Feb. 1980): "Happiness is a Warm Alien"
 Elliot S. Maggin
 Justice League of America #123 (Oct 1975): "Where on Earth Am I?"
 Justice League of America #124 (Nov. 1975): "Avenging Ghosts of the Justice Society!"
 52 #24 (Oct 18, 2006): "Week Twenty-Four"
 Dick Malmgren
 Pep Comics #400 (May 1985): "Pep 400"
Bill Mantlo
Howard the Duck #5 (black and white magazine format, May 1980): "The Tomb of Drãkula!"
 Marvel Premiere #24 (Sept. 1975): "Summerkill"
 Rich Margopoulos
 Pep Comics #400 (May 1985): "Pep 400"
Sheldon Mayer
 All-Flash #14 (Spring 1944)
 Comic Cavalcade #6 (Spring 1944): "They Are Invincible!"
 Val Mayerik
Man-Thing vol. 2, #11 (July 1981): "Hell's Gate"
Scott McCloud
 normalman-Megaton Man Special #1 (August 1994): "Lest No Bridge Be Unburned" - as "Zot McSchool"
 Merho
 Suske en Wiske: "De Speelgoedspiegel" (1989), alongside his character Marcel Kiekeboe from De Kiekeboes.
Al Milgrom
Detective Comics #482 (February–March 1979): "Bat-Mite's New York Adventure"
Master of Kung Fu #17 (April 1974): "Lair of the Lost"
Marvel Premiere #24 (Sept. 1975): "Summerkill"
Mark Millar
The Flash 80 Page Giant #1 (Aug. 1998): "Your Life Is My Business"
Simpsons Comics #88 (Nov. 2003): "Licence to Kilt"
Moebius (Jean Giraud)
Doctor Strange – Sorcerer Supreme #9 (Nov. 1989): "That Was Then... This Is NOW"
Doug Moench
 Master of Kung Fu #64 (May 1978): "Deadly Lesson: Like Father, Like Son...?"
Bob Montana
 Archie #2 (Spring 1943): "Bumble the Bee-tective"
 Grant Morrison
Animal Man #26 (Aug. 1990): "Deus Ex Machina"
Doom Patrol #58 (Oct. 1991): "Suicide Attack"
Simpsons Comics #88 (Nov.  2003): "Licence to Kilt"

N 
 Ann Nocenti
 The Incredible Hulk #291 (January 1984): "Old Soldiers Never Die!"
 Ryan North
 Howard the Duck #10 (October 2016): "...Hell If I Know..." (as "Ry-N")

O 
 Dennis O'Neil
 Batman #237 (Dec. 1971): "Night of the Reaper"
 Detective Comics #487 (Dec. 1979/Jan. 1980): "The Perils of Sergius" (O'Neil often used the pen name Sergius O'Shaugnessy)
Joe Orlando
The Warlord #35 (July 1980): "Gambit"

P
 Jimmy Palmiotti
Harley Quinn #0 (2013): "Picky Sicky"
Harley Quinn #27 (2017): "Master of Her Domain" 
 George Pérez
 Fantastic Four #176 (Nov. 1976): "Improbable As It May Seem – The Impossible Man Is Back in Town!"
 Marvel Two-In-One #60 (Feb. 1980): "Happiness is a Warm Alien"
 The New Teen Titans #20 (June 1982): "A Titanic Tale of Titans' Tomfoolery!"
 The Avengers vol. 3, #14 (March 1999): "Hi, Honey... ...I'm Hooooome!" *
Wonder Woman vol. 2, #8, p. 20: "Time Passages"
 Wendy Pini
 Ghost Rider #14
 Teen Titans vol. 2, #21
E*Man Comics #17 (1984): "Smeltquest"
 Bob Powell
 The Dreamer by Will Eisner (1986)
 Keith Pollard
 Fantastic Four #193 (Apr. 1978): "Improbable As It May Seem – The Impossible Man Is Back in Town!"
 Bruno Premiani
 The Doom Patrol #121 (Sept./Oct. 1968): "The Death of the Doom Patrol?"

Q
 Joshua Quagmire
 Critters #50 (March 1990): "X-Mass Blitz-Kringle"

 Joe Quinones
 Howard the Duck #10 (October 2016): "...Hell If I Know..." (as "Jho")

R
 George van Raemdonck
 He often drew himself in some stories of Bulletje en Boonestaak.
 Dennis M Reader
Super-Duper Comic (1946): "Electro Girl Battles 'The Gremlin's Post-War Plot"
 Trina Robbins
Wonder Woman #5 (1989): "Logo"
 John Romita Sr.
 The Amazing Spider-Man Special #5 (Nov. 1968): "Here We Go-a-Plotting" *
 Sub-Mariner #19 (November 1969): "Support Your Local Sting-Ray!"
 Iron Man #85 (April 1976): "...And The Freak Shall Inherit the Earth"
 Don Rosa
 Star Spangled War Stories #202 (Oct./Nov. 1976): "The Cure"
 Uncle Scrooge #319 (July 2003): "The Dutchman's Secret"
 Adrienne Roy
 The New Teen Titans #20 (June 1982): "A Titanic Tale of Titans' Tomfoolery!"
 Tales of the Teen Titans #50 (February 1985): "We Are Gathered Here Today"
Bob Rozakis
 Action Comics #476 (March 1977): "Clark Kent's Lonely Christmas!"
Detective Comics #482 (February–March 1979): "Bat-Mite's New York Adventure"
Laurie Rozakis
 Action Comics #476 (March 1977): "Clark Kent's Lonely Christmas!"
Edward Ryan
 Target Comics vol. 4, no. 1 (March 1943): "Target and the Targeteers"

S
 Samm Schwartz
 Pep Comics #400 (May 1985): "Pep 400"
 Julius Schwartz
 Strange Adventures #140 (May 1962), "The Strange Adventure That Really Happened"
 The Flash #179 (May 1968): "Flash – Fact Or Fiction"
 Justice League of America #103 (Dec. 1972): "A Stranger Walks among Us!" (mentioned, not seen)
 Detective Comics #453 (November 1975): cover
 X-Men #98 (April 1976): "Merry Christmas, X-Men..."
 Action Comics #476 (March 1977): "Clark Kent's Lonely Christmas!"
 Superman #411 (Sept. 1985): "The Last Earth-Prime Story"
 Action Comics #565 (March 1985): "Ambush Bug in '$ellout' or 'Manna from Mando'"
Ambush Bug #3 (Aug. 1985): "The Ambush Bug History of the DC Universe"
Ambush Bug #4 (Sept. 1985): "Whoops"
DC Comics Presents Hawkman #1 (Sept. 2004): "Secret Behind the Stolen Super-Weapons"
DC Comics Presents Justice League of America #1 (Oct. 2004): "Visitors Day"
Stu Schwartzberg
 Sub-Mariner #19 (November 1969): "Support Your Local Sting-Ray!"
John Severin
Sgt. Fury and his Howling Commandos Special #4 (Aug. 1968): "Gary and Dick Up Front!"
Sgt. Fury and his Howling Commandos Special #6 (Aug. 1970): "Through the Past Darkly"
Marie Severin
 Sub-Mariner #19 (November 1969): "Support Your Local Sting-Ray!"
 Fantastic Four #176 (Nov. 1976): "Improbable As It May Seem – The Impossible Man Is Back in Town!"
 Ms. Marvel vol 1. #15: "The Shark is a Very Deadly Beast"
Sgt Fury and His Howing Commandos #164 (June 1981)
Scott Shaw
Superman's Pal Jimmy Olsen #144 (Dec. 1971): "A Big Thing in a Deep Scottish Lake"
Jim Shooter
Iron Man #123 (June 1979): "Casino Fatale"
Howard the Duck #5 (black and white magazine format, May 1980): "The Tomb of Drãkula!"
Harry Shorten
 Archie #2 (Spring 1943): "Bumble the Bee-tective"
 Louis Silberkleit
 Pep Comics #400 (May 1985): "Pep 400"
 Joe Simon
 Justice Traps the Guilty #56 (Nov. 1953): Cover
 Boy Commandos #1 (Winter 1942–43): "Satan Wears a Swastika"
 Louise Simonson
 Man-Thing vol. 2, #11 (July 1981): "Hell's Gate"
 New Mutants #21 (November 1984): "Slumber Party!" (page 2)
Joe Sinnott
 Fantastic Four #176 (Nov. 1976): "Improbable As It May Seem – The Impossible Man Is Back in Town!"
 Steve Skeates
Marvel Preview  #23 (black and white magazine format, Fall, 1980): "Annie Mae"
 Marc Sleen
 The Adventures of Nero: He made countless cameo appearances in several of his albums, sometimes even directly interfering with his own characters.
 Roger Slifer
 The Complete Rog 2000 (1982): "The Coming of the Gang"
 Bob Smith
Detective Comics #482 (February–March 1979): "Bat-Mite's New York Adventure"
 Milt Snappin
Detective Comics #482 (February–March 1979): "Bat-Mite's New York Adventure"
 Art Spiegelman
 Supernatural Law Big First Amendment Issue (2005)
Al Stahl
Crack Comics #28, 30-32, 39 (August 1943): "Inkie"
 Jim Starlin
 Star Reach #1 (1974): "Death Building"
Master of Kung Fu #17 (April 1974): "Lair of the Lost"
 Ted Steele
 Active Comics #20 (Dec 1944/Jan 1945): "The Panthers Get the Ghost"
 Milt Stein
Crack Comics #35, 36 (August 1943): "Inkie"
 Flo Steinberg
 Sub-Mariner #19 (November 1969): "Support Your Local Sting-Ray!"
 What If? #11 (Oct. 1978): "What if the Fantastic Four Were the Original Marvel Bullpen?"
 Roger Stern
 The Complete Rog 2000 (1982): "The Coming of the Gang"
 Dave Stevens
 Dark Horse Presents # 100-3 (August 1995): "Concrete: The Artistic Impulse"
 Curt Swan
 Superman Annual # 9 (1983): "I Flew With Superman"

T
 Romeo Tanghal
 The New Teen Titans #20 (June 1982): "A Titanic Tale of Titans' Tomfoolery!"
 Dann Thomas
 What If #13 (Feb. 1979): "What If Conan the Barbarian Walked the Earth in the Twentieth Century?"
 Jean Thomas
 Sub-Mariner #19 (November 1969): "Support Your Local Sting-Ray!"
 The Avengers #83 (Dec. 1970): "Come on In... The Revolution's Fine!"
 Roy Thomas
 Fantastic Four Special #5 (Nov. 1967): "This is a Plot?" *
 The Amazing Spider-Man Special #5 (Nov. 1968): "Here We Go-a-Plotting" *
 Sub-Mariner #19 (November 1969): "Support Your Local Sting-Ray!"
 The Avengers #83 (Dec. 1970): "Come on In... The Revolution's Fine!"
 Marvel Feature #2 (March 1972): "Nightmare on Bald Mountain"
 Iron Man #72 (January 1975): "Convention of Fear!"
 Iron Man #85 (April 1976): "...And The Freak Shall Inherit the Earth"
 Fantastic Four #176 (Nov. 1976): "Improbable As It May Seem – The Impossible Man Is Back in Town!"
Thunder Bunny #1 (Jan. 1984), "The Greatest Story Ever Told"
 Freedom Fighters # 9 (Aug 1987), "Blitzkrieg at Buffalo"
Sgt. Fury and his Howling Commandos Special #6 (Aug. 1970): "Through the Past Darkly"
Sgt. Fury and his Howling Commandos #100 (July 1972): "100th Anniversary!"
Strange Tales featuring Warlock #181 (Aug. 1975): "1000 Clowns"
 Frank Thorne
Cerebus the Aardvark  #3 (Apr–May 1978): "Song of Red Sophia"
Thunder Bunny #1 (Jan. 1984), "The Greatest Story Ever Told"
Bruce Timm
 Harley Quinn Invades Comic-Con International San Diego #1 (Sept 2014)
Kathe Todd
 Those Annoying Post Brothers #27 (1992), "Con Job"
 Anthony Tollin
Detective Comics #482 (February–March 1979): "Bat-Mite's New York Adventure"
 Herb Trimpe
 Sub-Mariner #19 (November 1969): "Support Your Local Sting-Ray!"
 Marvel Premiere #24 (Sept. 1975): "Summerkill"

 George Tuska
 The Dreamer by Will Eisner (1986)

U
 Albert Uderzo
 Asterix and the Class Act (2003)
 Asterix and the Missing Scroll (2015)

V
 Willy Vandersteen
 Suske en Wiske: "De Zeven Snaren" (1968), "De Belhamel-bende" (1982).

 Irene Vartanoff
 Marvel Premiere #24 (Sept. 1975): "Summerkill"
 Iron Man #85 (April 1976): "...And The Freak Shall Inherit the Earth"

 Brian K. Vaughan
 Invincible #15 (July 2004)
Ex Machina #40 (February 2009): "Ruthless"

 John Verpoorten
 Sub-Mariner #19 (November 1969): "Support Your Local Sting-Ray!"
 Iron Man #85 (April 1976): "...And The Freak Shall Inherit the Earth"
 Fantastic Four #176 (Nov. 1976): "Improbable As It May Seem – The Impossible Man Is Back in Town!"
 Duffy Vohland
 The Complete Rog 2000 (1982): "The Coming of the Gang"

W
 Lori Walls
 Pep Comics #400 (May 1985): "Pep 400"
 Bill Walton
 Uncanny Tales #28 (January 1955): "Wiped Out!"
 Glynis Wein
 Justice League of America #103 (Dec. 1972): "A Stranger Walks among Us!"
 Amazing Adventures #16 (Jan. 1973): "And the Juggernaut Will Get You... If You Don't Watch Out!"
 Thor #207 (Jan. 1973): "Firesword!"
 Marvel Premiere #24 (Sept. 1975): "Summerkill"

 Len Wein
 Batman #237 (Dec. 1971): "Night of the Reaper"
 Justice League of America #103 (Dec. 1972): "A Stranger Walks among Us!"
 Amazing Adventures #16 (Jan. 1973): "And the Juggernaut Will Get You... If You Don't Watch Out!"
 Thor #207 (Jan. 1973): "Firesword!"
 Iron Man #85 (April 1976): "...And The Freak Shall Inherit the Earth"
 Fantastic Four #176 (Nov. 1976): "Improbable As It May Seem – The Impossible Man Is Back in Town!"
 Peter Parker, The Spectacular Spider-Man #48 (November 1980): "Double Defeat!"
 Freedom Fighters # 9 (Aug 1987), "Blitzkrieg at Buffalo"
 The New Teen Titans #20 (June 1982): "A Titanic Tale of Titans' Tomfoolery!"
 Marvel Premiere #24 (Sept. 1975): "Summerkill"
Wonder Woman vol. 2, #8, p. 20: "Time Passages"
 Mort Weisinger
 Action Comics #55 (Dec. 1942): "A Goof Named Tiny Rufe"
 Alan Weiss
 Batman #237 (Dec. 1971): "Night of the Reaper"
 Bob Wiacek
Man-Thing vol. 2, #11 (July 1981): "Hell's Gate"
 George Wildman
 Popeye #E14 (1972): "Popeye and Fine Arts and Humanities Careers"
 Bonnie Wilford
 Iron Fist #15 (Sept. 1977): "Enter the X-Men"
 Brittney Williams
 Patsy Walker A.K.A. Hellcat! issues 7-8 (August and September 2016)
 Renée Witterstaetter
 Sensational She-Hulk #40 (April, 1992)
 Sensational She-Hulk #43 (September, 1992): "Battle? Why?"
 Sensational She-Hulk #50: (April 1993): "He's Dead?!"
 Sensational She-Hulk #60 (December, 1993): "Bug Hunt"
 Bill Woggon
 Wilbur #13 (June 1947): "Katy Keene The Pin-up Queen"
 Wilbur #19 (June 1948): "Katy Keene"
 Katy Keene #1 (1949): "Congratulations to Katy Keene..."
 Katy Keene #8 (1952): "The Candy Kid"
 Katy Keene #14 (1954): "A Short Pig Tale"
 Marv Wolfman
 Fantastic Four #176 (Nov. 1976): "Improbable As It May Seem – The Impossible Man Is Back in Town!"
 Freedom Fighters # 9 (Aug 1987), "Blitzkrieg at Buffalo"
 The New Teen Titans #20 (June 1982): "A Titanic Tale of Titans' Tomfoolery!"
 Marvel Premiere #24 (Sept. 1975): "Summerkill"
 Wally Wood
 Weird Science 22 (1953): "My World"
 Bernie Wrightson
 Batman #237 (Dec. 1971): "Night of the Reaper"

Y
 Bill Yoshida
 Pep Comics #400 (May 1985): "Pep 400"
 Catherine Yronwode
 Miracleman #8 (June 1986)
 The Spirit #30 (Kitchen Sink Press, 1981)

Z
 Chip Zdarsky
 Howard the Duck #10 (October 2016): "...Hell If I Know..." (as "Chipp")
Mike Zeck
 Captain America #289 (Jan. 1984): Cover

References
All appearances sourced from original or reprinted comics, unless otherwise noted.

Cultural depictions of cartoonists
Creators
 Appearing